Compass Lexecon is a global economic consulting firm with headquarters in Chicago, Illinois. It provides analysis of economic issues for use in legal and regulatory proceedings, strategic decisions, and public policy debates. Compass Lexecon LLC was formed in January 2008 through the combination of Competition Policy Associates (COMPASS), founded in 2003, and Lexecon, founded in 1977, and operates as a wholly owned subsidiary of FTI Consulting, a global business advisory firm. Compass Lexecon has been ranked as one of the top competition economics firms worldwide.

Daniel Fischel is the chairman and president. Jonathan Orszag is senior managing director. In May 2013, Compass Lexecon acquired Princeton Economics Group, which provides economic research, data analysis and testimony to law firms and corporations. Compass Lexecon has 23 office locations in the Americas, Europe, Middle East, and Asia.

Mentions
In July 2014, in response to an inquiry from the Federal Communications Commission, the National Association of Broadcasters cited a report by Compass Lexecon on the economic benefits of exclusivity rules. Compass Lexecon was also mentioned as one of the firms hired to evaluate the settlement accord offered by J.P. Morgan to investors of its mortgage-backed securities. In February 2015, The New York Times covered a report written by Daniel Fischel, which examined the implications facing academic institutions that divest fossil fuel-related stocks. The Wall Street Journal published an opinion piece by Fischel on the same topic. In May 2015, Compass Lexecon was named Competition Economist Firm of the Year by Who's Who Legal. Additionally, Compass Lexecon's Janusz Ordover, a Senior Consultant, was named as the 2015 Competition Economist Individual Expert of the Year. In the same month, a Compass Lexecon report "claim[ed] the Gulf airlines are not creating new demand, but siphoning off passengers from existing airlines." In May 2019, Compass Lexecon was ranked first in GAR 100 Expert Witness Firms’ Power Index for the second consecutive year by Global Arbitration Review.

Practice areas
Compass Lexecon advertises expertise in the following practice areas:

 Antitrust & Competition
 Auctions
 Damages
 Derivatives & Structured Finance
 ERISA Litigation
 Energy, Healthcare
 Intellectual Property
 International Arbitration
 Regulatory Investigations
 Securities & Financial Markets
 Telecommunications, Transportation
 Valuation & Financial Analysis

Affiliates 

 Jean-Pierre Dubé
 Jonathan F. Foster
 David K.A. Mordecai
 Glenn Woroch
 Patrick Coen
 Alexander Teytelboym
 Alexandre De Cornière

See also
Analysis Group
Bates White
Berkeley Research Group
Brattle Group
Charles River Associates
Cornerstone Research
NERA Economic Consulting
Fideres
Frontier Economics

References

Consulting firms of the United States
Macroeconomics consulting firms
Law and economics